Russell Francis Cuddihey (born 8 September 1939) in Rawtenstall, England, is an English retired professional footballer who played as a wing half in the Football League.

References

1939 births
Living people
People from Rawtenstall
English footballers
Accrington Stanley F.C. (1891) players
English Football League players
Association football midfielders